The 1911 Western State Normal Hilltoppers football team represented Western State Normal School (later renamed Western Michigan University) as an independent during the 1911 college football season.  In their fifth season under head coach William H. Spaulding, the Hilltoppers compiled a 2–3 record and outscored their opponents, 110 to 59. Fullback Glenn Mayer was the team captain.

Schedule

References

Western State Normal Hilltoppers
Western Michigan Broncos football seasons
Western State Normal Hilltoppers football